Jørgen Rasmussen may refer to:
 Jørgen Rasmussen (footballer, born 1945), Danish footballer
 Jørgen Rasmussen (footballer, born 1937), Danish footballer
 Jørgen Buhl Rasmussen (born 1955), Danish chief executive of the brewing company Carlsberg Group
 Jørgen Frank Rasmussen (born 1930), Danish cyclist
 Jørgen Skafte Rasmussen (1878–1964), Danish engineer and industrialist

See also
 Jørgen Guldborg-Rasmussen, president of the Danish Scout Council